The following is a list of cast members of the British reality television programme Gogglebox, and its two spin-off shows, Gogglesprogs and Celebrity Gogglebox.

Gogglebox

Current
This is a list of the current cast members appearing in the show in order of their first appearance.

Former
This is a list of former cast members appearing in the show in order of their last appearance.

Duration

Gogglesprogs
A version of the show featuring only children, called Gogglesprogs, launched as a Christmas special on Christmas Day 2015, and was followed by a full-length series, which began airing on 17 June 2016.

Current
This is a list of the current cast members appearing in the show in order of their first appearance.

Former
This is a list of the former cast members appearing in the show in order of their last appearance.

Duration

Celebrity Gogglebox
This is a list of the celebrities that have appeared on Stand Up to Cancer specials, the Black to Front and pride specials, and regular series of Celebrity Gogglebox.

References

British television-related lists